The Larsen Special II,  is an early homebuilt aircraft that was  designed and built in Norway. It was the first homebuilt aircraft to be issued a certificate of airworthiness in Norway.

Design and development
Carl Ludvig Larsen was a decorated World War II pilot who produced his own aircraft design.

The Larsen Special II started as a single-seat low-wing, retractable tricycle gear aircraft. It is built of all-aluminium construction. It features  tip tanks and a swept tail. The wing uses a center-section split-flap.

Operational history
The prototype was built in 1952, and test flown with engines ranging from  It was registered as LN-11. On 9 July 1955 the aircraft crashed at Fornebu and was rebuilt as the Larsen Special II, registered as LN LMI a two-seat aircraft powered by a  Continental O-200 engine. It crashed again in 1975 and 1982. The prototype is owned by the Norwegian Aviation Museum in  Bodø, and is awaiting restoration.

Specifications (Larsen Special II)

References

External links
Norsk Luftfartsmuseum

Homebuilt aircraft